Curling at the 2011 Winter Universiade took place at the Milli Piyango Curling Arena from January 27 to February 6. Ten men's and women's teams were qualified to compete in the Universiade based on their performance at the previous competition and at the 2009 and 2010 World Junior Curling Championships and the 2009 and 2010 Men's and Women's Curling Championships. They competed in a round-robin format, and the top four teams advanced to a single knockout round to determine the final placements.

South Korea won the gold-medal match over Switzerland in 9 ends, while Great Britain won a close match over Russia in an extra end.

Qualification

Men

China withdrew and were replaced with Poland.

Women

USA withdrew and were replaced with Poland.

Men

Teams

Standings

Results

Draw 1
Friday, January 28, 14:00

Draw 2
Saturday, January 29, 9:00

Draw 3
Saturday, January 29, 19:00

Draw 4
Sunday, January 30, 14:00

Draw 5
Monday, January 31, 9:00

Draw 6
Monday, January 31, 19:00

Draw 7
Tuesday, February 1, 14:00

Draw 8
Wednesday, February 2, 9:00

Draw 9
Wednesday, February 2, 19:00

Tiebreaker
Thursday, February 3, 14:00

Playoffs

Semifinals
Friday, February 4, 13:00

Bronze Medal Game
Friday, February 4, 19:00

Gold Medal Game
Saturday, February 5, 14:00

Women

Teams

Standings

Results

Draw 1
Friday, January 28, 9:00

Draw 2
Friday, January 28, 19:00

Draw 3
Saturday, January 29, 14:00

Draw 4
Sunday, January 30, 9:00

Draw 5
Sunday, January 30, 19:00

Draw 6
Monday, January 31, 14:00

Draw 7
Tuesday, February 1, 9:00

Draw 8
Tuesday, February 1, 19:00

Draw 9
Wednesday, February 2, 14:00

Playoffs

Semifinals
Friday, February 4, 9:00

Bronze Medal Game
Friday, February 4, 19:00

Gold Medal Game
Saturday, February 5, 9:00

Medals table

References

External links
Results at FISU

2011 in curling
Curling
2011
International curling competitions hosted by Turkey